Robert William James Dingwall  (born 6 August 1950) is a British sociologist and academic, specialising in medical sociology. He has been Professor of Sociology at Nottingham Trent University since 1990. His research is on the interdisciplinary study of law, medicine, science and technology.

Early life and education
Dingwall was born on 6 August 1950. He attended the independent St Peter's School, York from 1963 to 1968.

At St John's College, Cambridge, Dingwall studied economics for part I of the Tripos and then switched to social and political science for part II, graduating with a Bachelor of Arts (BA) degree in 1971: as per tradition, his BA was promoted to a Master of Arts (MA Cantab) degree. He then studied medical sociology at the University of Aberdeen, graduating with a Doctor of Philosophy (PhD) degree in 1974. His doctoral thesis was titled "the social organisation of health visitor training".

Career
From 1975 to 1977, after completing his doctorate, Dingwall was a research fellow in the Institute of Medical Sociology at the University of Aberdeen. From 1978 to 1990, he worked at the University of Oxford: he was a research officer, then senior research officer, and finally a research fellow at its Centre for Socio-Legal Studies and Wolfson College, Oxford. He has been Professor of Sociology at the Nottingham Trent University since 1990, where he founded the Institute for Science and Society. He was elected Fellow of the Academy of Social Sciences (FAcSS) in 2002: he was a member of its council from 2013 to 2019. He is an Honorary Member of the Faculty of Public Health.

He has served on NERVTAG, a scientific advisory panel for epidemic preparedness of HMG. He has chaired the Bioscience for Society Strategy Panel of the Biotechnology and Biological Sciences Research Council and previously served as a member of the Committee on Ethical Aspects of Pandemic Influenza and of the Civil Justice Council. He has also been a consultant to industry on the ethical use of pharmaceuticals. He has also received commissions from the Royal Pharmaceutical Society and the Food Standards Agency.

Public engagement (COVID-19)
In early May 2020, during the COVID-19 pandemic, Dingwall was interviewed by a journalist at the Daily Telegraph over the Government's coronavirus warnings. He opined that:

In the same interview, Dingwall stressed that:

On 18 July, Dingwall criticised another SAGE report, which forecasted 120,000 deaths from COVID-19 in wintertime 2020–21. In his estimation "was based on flawed mathematics" and created an "environment of fear". By 31 March 2021, there had been a total of 89,588 deaths from laboratory-confirmed COVID-19 in the United Kingdom.

References

British sociologists
Medical sociologists
Living people
Academics of Nottingham Trent University
Alumni of St John's College, Cambridge
Alumni of the University of Aberdeen
Academics of the University of Oxford
Fellows of the Academy of Social Sciences
Fellows of Wolfson College, Oxford
People educated at St Peter's School, York
People from Wollaton
1950 births